Deyovaisio Zeefuik (born 11 March 1998) is a Dutch professional footballer who plays as a right back for Italian  club Hellas Verona on loan from  club Hertha BSC.

Club career

Ajax & Jong Ajax
Zeefuik is a youth exponent from AFC Ajax. He made his professional debut at Jong Ajax on 8 August 2016 in an Eerste Divisie game against FC Emmen.

FC Groningen
On 30 January 2018, it was announced that Zeefuik was loaned at FC Groningen until the end of the season. On 18 May 2018, Zeefuik signed a three-year contract at FC Groningen, officially transferring him from Ajax.

Hertha Berlin
On 6 August 2020, Zeefuik transferred to Bundesliga side Hertha BSC.

Blackburn Rovers
On 14 January 2022, Blackburn Rovers announced the signing of Zeefuik on loan, with a view to making the deal permanent at the end of the season.

Hellas Verona
On 16 January 2023, Zeefuik joined Hellas Verona in Italy on loan until 30 June 2023, with an option to buy.

Personal life
Born in the Netherlands, Zeefuik is of Surinamese descent. He is the younger brother of former footballer Género Zeefuik, whilst his younger brother Lequincio Zeefuik plays for FC Volendam.

Career statistics

References

External links
 

1998 births
Footballers from Amsterdam
Dutch sportspeople of Surinamese descent
Living people
Dutch footballers
Netherlands youth international footballers
Association football defenders
AFC Ajax players
FC Groningen players
Jong Ajax players
Hertha BSC players
Blackburn Rovers F.C. players
Hellas Verona F.C. players
Eredivisie players
Eerste Divisie players
Bundesliga players
English Football League players
Dutch expatriate footballers
Expatriate footballers in Germany
Dutch expatriate sportspeople in Germany
Expatriate footballers in England
Dutch expatriate sportspeople in England
Expatriate footballers in Italy
Dutch expatriate sportspeople in Italy